Section X is a 2005 concept album by Danish Progressive metal band Beyond Twilight.

Track listing 

 "Be Careful It's My Head Too (Intro)" – 1:04
 "The Path of Darkness" – 6:35
 "Shadow Self" – 6:51
 "Sleeping Beauty" – 7:24
 "The Dark Side" – 4:07
 "Portrait F in Dark Waters (Instrumental)" – 2:35
 "Ecstasy Arise" – 7:01
 "Section X" – 9:07

Personnel

Finn Zierler – keyboards
Kelly Sundown Carpenter – lead vocals
Anders Ericson Kragh – guitar
Jacob Hansen − rhythm guitar
Anders Devillian Lindgren – bass
Tomas Fredén – drums, percussion

Additional musicians
Truls Haugen (from Circus Maximus) - choirs, additional vocals on track 04
Michael Eriksen (from Circus Maximus) - choirs, additional vocals on track 05
Lene Roesen - female choirs

References

2005 albums
Beyond Twilight albums
Massacre Records albums